Sylvester Emmanuel Sanziri is a Ghanaian politician and member of the first parliament of the second republic of Ghana representing Lawra-Nandom constituency in the Upper Region of Ghana under the membership of the Progess Party (PP)

Early life and education 
Sylvester was born on 1930. He attended Tamale Government Training College. where he obtained a Teachers' Training Certificate and later worked as a Teacher before going into Parliament.

Personal life 
He is a male in gender and Catholicism in faith. Also a Teacher in profession.

Politics 
He began his political career in 1969 as a parliamentary candidate for the  constituency of Lawra-Nandom in the Upper Region of Ghana prior to the commencement of the 1969 Ghanaian parliamentary election.

He was sworn into the First Parliament of the Second Republic of Ghana on 1 October 1969, after being pronounced winner at the 1969 Ghanaian election held on 26 August 1969. and his tenure of office ended on 13 January 1972.

References 

1930 births
Ghanaian MPs 1969–1972
Progress Party (Ghana) politicians
Ghanaian educators
Ghanaian Christians
Living people